The 43rd British Academy Film Awards, given by the British Academy of Film and Television Arts in 1990, honoured the best films of 1989.

Peter Weir's Dead Poets Society won the award for Best Film.

Winners and nominees
Academy Fellowship: Paul Fox

Statistics

See also
 62nd Academy Awards
 15th César Awards
 42nd Directors Guild of America Awards
 3rd European Film Awards
 47th Golden Globe Awards
 1st Golden Laurel Awards
 10th Golden Raspberry Awards
 4th Goya Awards
 5th Independent Spirit Awards
 16th Saturn Awards
 42nd Writers Guild of America Awards

References

External links
 Film in 1990 at BAFTA
 BAFTA Awards (1990) at IMDb

Film043
1989 film awards
1990 in British cinema
March 1990 events in the United Kingdom
1990 in Scotland
1989 awards in the United Kingdom